The 2021–22 Kennesaw State Owls men's basketball team represented Kennesaw State University in the 2021–22 NCAA Division I men's basketball season. The Owls, led by third-year head coach Amir Abdur-Rahim, played their home games at the KSU Convocation Center in Kennesaw, Georgia as members of the East Division of the ASUN Conference.

Previous season
In a season limited by the ongoing COVID-19 pandemic, the Owls finished the 2020–21 season 5–19, 2–13 in ASUN play to finish in last place. They lost in the first round of the ASUN tournament to Liberty.

Roster

Schedule and results

|-
!colspan=12 style=| Non-conference regular season

|-
!colspan=12 style=| ASUN Conference regular season

|-
!colspan=12 style=| ASUN tournament

|-

Source

References

Kennesaw State Owls men's basketball seasons
Kennesaw State Owls
Kennesaw State Owls men's basketball
Kennesaw State Owls men's basketball